Mahmudabad (also Romanized as Maḩmūdābād; also known as Maḩmūdābād-e Kharrūd) is a village in Zeynabad Rural District, Shal District, Buin Zahra County, Qazvin Province, Iran. At the 2006 census, its population was 40, in 11 families.

References 

Populated places in Buin Zahra County